Typhlomangelia nivalis is a species of sea snail, a marine gastropod mollusk in the family Borsoniidae.

Description
The size of an adult shell varies between 12 mm and 27 mm. The turreted, white shell has a long spire with ten whorls. The periphery is tuberculated longitudinally. The ribs which give rise to them are very short. The shell is covered by close revolving striae. The shoulder of the whorls are slanting.

Distribution
This species occurs in the Mediterranean Sea and in the Atlantic Ocean off the British Isles, Iceland, Norway, Spain, Portugal, the Azores, Senegal

References

 Lovén S., 1846: Nordens Hafs-Mollusker [list of species bears subtitle "Index Molluscorum litora Scandinaviae occidentalia habitantium"] Öfversigt af Kongl. Vetenskaps-Akademiens Förhandlingar 3(5): 134–160, 3(6): 182–204
 Dautzenberg P. & Fischer H., 1896: Dragages effectués par l'Hirondelle et par la Princesse Alice 1888–1895. 1. Mollusques Gastropodes; Mémoires de la Société Zoologique de France 9: 395–498, pl. 15–22 
 Locard A., 1897–1898: Expéditions scientifiques du Travailleur et du Talisman pendant les années 1880, 1881, 1882 et 1883. Mollusques testacés.; Paris, Masson vol. 1 [1897], p. 1–516 pl. 1–22 vol. 2 [1898], p. 517–1044 pl. 23–40
 Bouchet, P. & Warén, A., 1980. Revision of the northeast Atlantic bathyal and abyssal Turridae (Mollusca, Gastropoda). Journal of Molluscan Studies: 1–119, sér. Suppl.8
 Vaught, K.C. (1989). A classification of the living Mollusca. American Malacologists: Melbourne, FL (USA). . XII, 195 pp.
 Gofas, S.; Le Renard, J.; Bouchet, P. (2001). Mollusca, in: Costello, M.J. et al. (Ed.) (2001). European register of marine species: a check-list of the marine species in Europe and a bibliography of guides to their identification. Collection Patrimoines Naturels, 50: pp. 180–213
 Tucker, J.K. 2004 Catalog of recent and fossil turrids (Mollusca: Gastropoda). Zootaxa 682:1–1295.

External links
 
 Lectotype at MNHN, Paris

nivalis
Gastropods described in 1846